Ziarat-e Ali (also Romanized as Zīārat-e ‘Alī, Zeyārat-e ‘Alī, and Zīyarat Alī; also Zīārat-e ‘Alī-ye ‘Olyā and Dar-e Khūneh-ye ‘Alī) is a city and capital of Rudkhaneh District, in Rudan County, Hormozgan Province, Iran. At the 2006 census, its population was 2,506, in 523 families.

References 

Populated places in Rudan County
Cities in Hormozgan Province